Rear Admiral  Joseph Leslie Blackham  (29 February 1912 – 18 May 2004) was a Royal Navy officer.  He saw service in the Second World War and in the Korean War.  He was appointed CB in 1965 and was later High Sheriff of the Isle of Wight.

References 

1912 births
2004 deaths
High Sheriffs of the Isle of Wight
Royal Navy officers of World War II
Companions of the Order of the Bath
Deputy Lieutenants of the Isle of Wight